Antonio Carmine Di Bartolomeo (born 24 August 1964, Slough, Buckinghamshire - now Berkshire, England) is an English singer performing under the stage name Tony Di Bart. Di Bart is best known for his single "The Real Thing" which reached number one in the UK Singles Chart in 1994.

Di Bart began his career as a bathroom salesman in Iver, Buckinghamshire, before achieving chart success. He topped the charts in the United Kingdom for one week during May 1994, with a remixed version of his co written release from November 1993, "The Real Thing". 

Di Bart's subsequent singles did not achieve the same level of commercial success. He still makes appearances when requested, and was one of the judges at a village fete in Iver, Buckinghamshire, in July 2013 and in Skegness, Lincolnshire, in 2014, as he continues to promote "The Real Thing".

Singles

References

English male singers
People from Slough
Living people
1964 births
British people of Italian descent